John Sinclair (born 12 April 1952) is an English keyboardist who has played for bands such as The Babys, Heavy Metal Kids, Savoy Brown, The Cult, but is probably best known for his time in Uriah Heep and playing for Ozzy Osbourne's band. He also is credited with styling keyboard parts for This Is Spinal Tap.

Sinclair is now a qualified hypnotherapist.

Discography

With Babys
Head First (1978)

With Black Sabbath
Under Wheels of Confusion 1970–1987

With The Cult
Pure Cult

With Dunmore
Dunmore

With Richard Grieco
Waiting for the Sky To Fall

With Lion
Running All Night (1980)

With Heavy Metal Kids
Kitsch
Chelsea Kids

With Uriah Heep
 Abominog (1982)
Tour Instruments - Prophet 5 Polyphonic Synthesizer, Mellotron M400, Hammond B3 with modified 122 Leslie cabinet (Crown DC 300 Amp and JBL 15" speaker)
 Head First (1983)
 Equator (1985)

With Ozzy Osbourne
No Rest for the Wicked (1988)
Just Say Ozzy (live-1989)
No More Tears (1991)
Live & Loud (1993)
The Ozzman Cometh Compilation
Live at Budokan (live)
Prince of Darkness Compilation box-set

With Cozy Powell
The Drums Are Back

With Savoy Brown
Rock 'N' Roll Warriors
Raw Live 'N Blue

With Shy
Brave The Storm

With Spinal Tap
This Is Spinal Tap

With Roadway
The EP (2011)

References

External links
Official John Sinclair website
John Sinclair at The Milarus Mansion

1952 births
Living people
Musicians from Wembley
Singers from London
Uriah Heep (band) members
The Ozzy Osbourne Band members
English rock keyboardists
English heavy metal keyboardists
English session musicians